Chiriunuyoc (possibly from Quechua chiri cold, unu water, -yuq a suffix to indicate ownership, "the one with cold water") is a mountain in the Vilcanota mountain range in the Andes of Peru, about  high. It is situated in the Cusco Region, Quispicanchi Province, Marcapata District, east of the lake Singrenacocha. Chiriunuyoc lies northwest of the mountains Aquichua, Quinsachata and Quehuesiri.

References 

Mountains of Cusco Region
Mountains of Peru